Viitaniemi School (Viitaniemen koulu in Finnish) is a lower secondary school in Jyväskylä, Finland. 
 
Viitaniemi School has approximately 500 pupils and 50 teachers. Pupils are in the grades 7-9. The school was established in 1958 and the school building was totally renovated 2007-2009. Viitaniemi School is known for its lively international connections. 

The pedagogical aims of Viitaniemi School are an individual approach and democracy. Pupils are met as individuals and everyone’s opinions are respected. The school has special classes for sport. There is an active pupils’ association at school arranging different kinds of activities. Also the members of the Viitaniemi School parents’ association meet every month and discuss current school matters. Viitaniemi School is located next to Lake Tuomiojärvi, about one kilometre from the city centre.

English-speaking classes in Viitaniemi School

In Jyväskylä the English-speaking classes are located in Kortepohja Elementary School (grades 1-6) and in Viitaniemi School (grades 7-9).
English-speaking classes are intended for families coming from abroad and staying temporarily or permanently in Finland, and for Finnish families in which English is spoken. Currently, there are 32 students in the English-speaking classes of Viitaniemi School. Most of them have Finnish as their mother tongue but there are some who study Finnish as their foreign language. Instruction in most theoretical subjects is given in English but in practical subjects, as well as in Swedish, the students are integrated into Finnish-speaking groups.

References

See also
Official website

Secondary schools in Finland
Jyväskylä
Buildings and structures in Central Finland
Educational institutions established in 1958
1958 establishments in Finland